The CONCACAF Nations League is an international football competition contested by the senior men's national teams of the member associations of CONCACAF, the regional governing body of North America, Central America, and the Caribbean. The tournament takes place on dates allocated for international friendlies on the FIFA International Match Calendar. A one-time qualifying tournament took place from September 2018 to March 2019 and the inaugural tournament began in September 2019. The teams are divided into three leagues of four groups, from League A to League C. The winners of each group from League A get to play the Finals, constituted of the semi finals, a third-place play-off, and the final.

CONCACAF Nations League record

*Draws include knockout matches decided on penalties.
**Group stage played home and away. Flag shown represents host nation for the finals stage. Red border colour indicates the finals stage will be held on home soil

List of matches

2019–20 CONCACAF Nations League

Group stage

Knockout phase
Semi-final

Final

2022–23 CONCACAF Nations League

Group stage

Goalscorers

Bold players are the players who are still active.

Notes

References

External links 

CONCACAF Nations League
Mexico national football team